Yaychi (also Romanized as Yāychī) is a village in Hir Rural District, Hir District, Ardabil County, Ardabil Province, Iran. At the 2006 census, its population was 261, in 51 families.

References 

Towns and villages in Ardabil County